John Doherty (January 16, 1826 in New York City – April 20, 1859 in Albany, New York) was an American politician from New York.

Life
He was the son of Patrick Doherty (1794–1849) who came from Ireland to New York City about 1811, and fought in the War of 1812. John Doherty studied law, was admitted to the bar in 1847, and commenced practice in New York City. After the death of his father, he abandoned the law and looked after his father's business instead.

He was an alderman (19th Ward) in 1852 and 1853.

He was a member of the New York State Senate (7th D.) in 1858 and 1859. He died on the day after the Legislature adjourned in April 1859. He never married.

Sources
 The New York Civil List compiled by Franklin Benjamin Hough, Stephen C. Hutchins and Edgar Albert Werner (1867; pg. 442)
 Biographical Sketches of the State Officers and Members of the Legislature of the State of New York in 1859 by William D. Murray (pg. 49ff)
 Manual of the Corporation of New York (1852; pg. 201)
 The Late Senator Doherty in NYT on April 22, 1859

1826 births
1859 deaths
Democratic Party New York (state) state senators
New York City Council members
19th-century American politicians